Island City is an unincorporated community in Gentry County, in the U.S. state of Missouri.

History
A post office called Island City was established in 1858, and remained in operation until 1906. The community took its name from nearby Island Creek.

References

Unincorporated communities in Gentry County, Missouri
Unincorporated communities in Missouri